Lions and foxes may refer to:

Lions and foxes, an analogy used in The Prince by Machiavelli
Lions and foxes, Machiavelli's analogy expanded on in The Mind and Society by Vilfredo Pareto

See also
The Lion and the Fox, fable by Aesop
The Fox and the Sick Lion, another separate fable by Aesop
The Lion, the Bear and the Fox, fable by Aesop
The Lion, the Fox & the Eagle, non-fiction book by Canadian journalist Carol Off